Renê Rodrigues Martins (born 14 September 1992), simply known as Renê, is a Brazilian footballer who plays as a left back for Internacional.

Club career

Early career
Born in Picos, Piauí, Renê made his senior debut with hometown club Picos in 2011. He subsequently moved to Sport, being initially assigned to the under-20 squad.

Sport
Renê made his first team debut on 15 January 2012, starting in a 1–1 Campeonato Pernambucano away draw against Araripina. He scored his first goal for the club on 5 February, netting the first in a 2–1 win at Serra Talhada.

Renê made his Série A debut on 19 May 2012, coming on as a second half substitute for Thiaguinho in a 1–1 home draw against Flamengo. He only became a regular starter during the 2014, appearing in all league matches, all as a starter; on 10 September of that year, he renewed his contract until 2017.

Renê scored his first goal in the main category on 22 August 2015, netting the first in a 1–2 loss at Figueirense.

Flamengo
On 6 February 2017, Renê signed a four-year contract with fellow top-tier club Flamengo, mainly as a replacement to Monaco-bound Jorge, for a fee of R$3.2 million for 50% of his federative rights. He made his debut for the club ten days later, starting in a 1–0 home win over América Mineiro, for the year's Primeira Liga.

After spending his first year as a backup to Miguel Trauco, Renê became the first-choice in the 2018 campaign, but lost his starting spot in 2019 after the arrival of Filipe Luís. On 28 January 2020, he renewed his contract until 2022.

Career statistics

Club

Honours

Club
Sport
Copa do Nordeste: 2014
Campeonato Pernambucano: 2014

Flamengo
Copa Libertadores: 2019
Recopa Sudamericana: 2020
Campeonato Brasileiro Série A: 2019, 2020
Supercopa do Brasil: 2020, 2021
Campeonato Carioca: 2017, 2019, 2020, 2021

Individual
 Bola de Prata: 2018
 Campeonato Brasileiro Série A Team of the Year: 2018
 Campeonato Carioca Team of the Year: 2019

References

External links

1992 births
Living people
Sportspeople from Piauí
Association football defenders
Brazilian footballers
Campeonato Brasileiro Série A players
Campeonato Brasileiro Série B players
Sport Club do Recife players
CR Flamengo footballers
Sport Club Internacional players